Tanushree Dutta (pronounced ) is an Indian actress and model. Dutta won the Femina Miss India Universe title in 2004 at age 20. In the same year at the Miss Universe beauty pageant held in Ecuador, she represented India amongst 133 other countries, where she was among the top ten finalists.

Dutta has appeared in mostly Hindi films from 2005 to 2010. Some of her best known films includes Aashiq Banaya Aapne, Bhagam Bhag and Dhol. In September 2018, after having been out of the Bollywood spotlight for several years, Dutta gave an interview to Zoom TV in which she accused Nana Patekar of sexually harassing her on the sets of the 2009 film Horn 'Ok' Pleassss. It was a catalyst for the "Me Too" movement in India.

Personal life
Tanushree was born in Jamshedpur, Jharkhand, India. As of September 2018, Tanushree is a permanent resident of the US.

Dutta has dated Aditya Datt. Ishita Dutta Sheth is her younger sister.

In an interview in 2013, she said that she hit depression after being traumatized on the sets of Horn 'Ok' Pleassss. She took a break and tried recuperation using eastern spirituality. Initially, she stayed at an ashram for one and a half years. Then, she went to Ladakh where she learned Buddhist meditation. She also practices Vipassana meditation.

Career
In 2003, Dutta won the Femina Miss India pageant held in Mumbai. As a result, she represented India at the Miss Universe 2004 Pageant which took place in Quito, Ecuador, where she was placed as the sixth runner-up.

She made her debut in Tamil cinema in Theeratha Vilayattu Pillai and her Bollywood début in 2005, appearing in Chocolate and Aashiq Banaya Aapne.
In 2006 she also appeared in the song "Jab Kabhi" in 36 China Town.

Me Too Movement
On 26 September 2018, Dutta gave an interview to Zoom TV in which she accused Nana Patekar of sexually harassing her on the sets of the 2009 film Horn 'Ok' Pleassss. This was a catalyst for the "Me Too" movement in India.
Dutta had first made the allegations against Patekar in 2008, filing a complaint with the Cine & TV Artists Association (CINTAA) but no action was taken as the case was considered a criminal case. The allegation was repeated in 2013 in an interview, and again largely ignored. It was not until her September 2018 statements that the CINTAA apologized to Dutta, admitting that the "chief grievance of sexual harassment wasn't even addressed [in 2008]" but added that since the case was more than three years old, they could not reopen it.

Janice Sequeira, a journalist, backed her allegations, claiming to be an eyewitness of the incident. She also alleged that filmmaker Vivek Agnihotri had told her to remove her clothes and dance with Irrfan Khan to act on the sets of Chocolate (2005). She said Khan and Sunil Shetty stood up for her during this episode. Agnihotri refuted all allegations and shared that it is an attempt to get publicity by Dutta and to malign his image in a legal notice sent to her. The assistant director of Chocolate, Sattyajit Gazmer, also dismissed Dutta's claims.

In another interview, Dutta said, "He [Patekar] called the MNS party to bash up my car. He was behind everything and was supported by choreographer Ganesh Acharya." In a video from 2008 that went viral on the internet, it was seen the journalists and not the MNS were seen thrashing Dutta's car. A journalist named Pawan Bharadwaj was seen thrashing the car's windshield with his camera, who later clarified that he attacked her car because he had a fight with Dutta's team prior to the incident.

Mahrashtra Navnirman Sena filed a defamation case against Dutta. She was also served with two legal notices from Patekar and Agnihotri. Subsequently, on 6 October, Dutta filed an FIR at Oshiwara police station against Patekar; director of Horn 'Ok' Pleassss, Rakesh Sarang; choreographer Acharya and producer Sami Siddiqui.

On 13 October 2018, Dutta's advocate Nitin Satpute submitted an application at the Oshiwara police station in Mumbai saying that actor Nana Patekar, choreographer Ganesh Acharya, producer Samee Siddiqui and director Rakesh Sarang be made to undergo narco-analysis, brain mapping and lie detector tests.

In June 2019, Patekar was cleared of the sexual harassment charges by the police. The B-Summary report filed by the Oshiwara police station in Mumbai said that the complaint filed by Tanushree could be "malicious" and "out of revenge".

Filmography

Awards and nominations

References

External links

 
 Tanushree Dutta on Instagram

21st-century Indian actresses
Actresses from Jharkhand
Actresses in Hindi cinema
Actresses in Tamil cinema
Actresses in Telugu cinema
Femina Miss India winners
Indian film actresses
Female models from Jharkhand
Living people
Miss Universe 2004 contestants
People from Jamshedpur
Savitribai Phule Pune University alumni
1984 births